In Alevism, a Rehber also known as Murshid is one of the 12 ranks of Imam in Alevism. A Rehber assists the Pir, provides information to the newcomers and prepares them for commitment to the Alevi path or Tariqat.

Turkish culture
Alevism
Islam in Turkey
Shia Islam in Turkey